"Is It Really Over" is a 1965 single by Jim Reeves.  "Is It Really Over" was Reeves' third posthumous release to hit number one on the U.S. country singles chart. The single stayed at the top for three weeks and spent a total of nineteen weeks on the chart.  "Is It Really Over" peaked at number seventy-nine on the Hot 100 and at number ten on the Easy Listening charts.

Chart performance

Awards and nominations

Notes

References

Jim Reeves songs
1965 singles
Song recordings produced by Chet Atkins
1965 songs
Songs written by Jim Reeves